Nurlan Sekenovich Ormanbetov (born 12 January 1962) is a lieutenant general in the Armed Forces of the Republic of Kazakhstan serving as current commander-in-chief in the Kazakh Air Defense Forces. He served commander-in-chief twice from 2013 to 2017 and was reappointed for the second term on 16 March 2020. He also served as a deputy Chief of the Joint Staff (CJS) in intergovernmental military organization, the Collective Security Treaty Organization in February 2018.

Biography 
Ormanbetov was born in Zaysan, East Kazakhstan Region. He obtained his graduation from the Kharkov Higher Military Aviation School of Pilots in 1983 and Gagarin Air Force Academy of Yu. A. Gagarin in 1996. He is also a graduate of the Military Academy of the General Staff of the Armed Forces of the Russian Federation.

Career 
After obtaining graduation from Kharkov Higher Military Aviation School of Pilots in 1983, he was enlisted in the Kazakh Air Defense Forces as a pilot and later flight commander of an aviation regiment until 1987. He was later transferred to Poland where he served in the Northern Group of Forces as a commander of an air regiment and deputy squadron commander at the military unit #21751 until he joined Order of the Red Banner Kutuzov Academy in 1993. In the same year he became deputy commander of the military unit #65229 for flight training and then unit #65229 in 1996, and unit #21751 in 2000. Two years later in 2002, he became commander of the air force base unit #21751.

In 2007 Ormanbetov became deputy commander-in-chief of the Kazakh Air Defense Forces, and in 2010 first deputy commander-in-chief. In 2012 he was appointed as head of the Main Directorate for Combat and Physical Training of the Air Defense Forces, and in 2017 deputy chief of the general staff in the Kazakh Armed Forces.

Awards 
Order of Courage
Military Merit Medal
Order "For Service to the Homeland in the Armed Forces of the USSR"  III degree
Medal of the Order "For Merit to the Fatherland"  II degree

References 

Living people
1962 births
Kazakhstani military personnel
Military Academy of the General Staff of the Armed Forces of Russia alumni
Recipients of the Medal of the Order "For Merit to the Fatherland" II class
Recipients of the Order "For Service to the Homeland in the Armed Forces of the USSR", 2nd class